The 2015 Rose of Tralee was the 56th edition of the annual Irish international festival held on 17–18 August 2015. The competition was televised live on RTÉ television.	
	
Meath Rose Elysha Brennan was announced as the winner by Dáithí Ó Sé on the night of 18 August.	
The 22-year-old medical student, studying at the Royal College of Surgeons in Dublin is from Bettystown had been the favourite to win the contest. She is also first Meath Rose to win and the first to represent the county at the Dome in Tralee. It was the first since the inaugural festival in 1959 that the winner was in its debutante year.

RTÉ ratings showed that 760,300 viewers tuned into the show, making it the ninth most watched show on RTÉ so far in 2015. Twitter users sent over 52,000 Rose of Tralee-related tweets over the two days of the show.

References

External links
Official Site

Rose of Tralee
Rose of Tralee
Rose of Tralee